Carmen Farmer (born December 4, 1980) is an American rugby player and attorney. In 2016, she was named to the United States women's national rugby union team for the 2016 Summer Olympics in Rio de Janeiro.

Early life 
Farmer grew up in Richmond, Virginia. As a high school student, she played softball, volleyball, and basketball. Farmer attended the Virginia Tech where she received a full scholarship for softball. She was the starting shortstop on the team from 2000 through 2003.

Career 
After college, Farmer attended law school at the University of Maryland, graduating in 2006. She then worked as an attorney for the non-profit Eastern Shore Land Conservancy.

Rugby player 
Farmer started playing rugby at age 31 after a friend from Australia recommended she try the sport. Farmer decided to try the sport for fun and found the closest rugby club to where she lived, located in Annapolis, Maryland. In 2012, she began playing 15 player rugby at Severn River in Maryland. The Severn River team reached the national championship game that  year where a national team coach approached Farmer. Farmer played her first game for a United States national team in 2013.

By 2014 Farmer was playing rugby sevens and had progressed enough to play for the United States in the World Cup. In April 2015 she moved to Chula Vista, California to train at the national training facility.  Farmer was part of the U.S. team that secured a spot in the 2016 Summer Olympics at the 2015 NACRA Sevens Championships. In July 2016, Farmer was chosen for the U.S. Olympic team in Rio de Janeiro. At 6-foot-1, Farmer stands out as a player for her combination of size and speed.

References

External links 
 Carmen Farmer at USA Rugby
 
 
 
 

1980 births
Living people
Female rugby sevens players
American female rugby sevens players
United States international rugby sevens players
Olympic rugby sevens players of the United States
Rugby sevens players at the 2016 Summer Olympics
Virginia Tech alumni
Sportspeople from Virginia
Virginia Tech Hokies softball players